Wells v Devani [2019] UKSC 4 is an English contract law case, concerning agreements to agree.

Facts
Devani, an estate agent, claimed Wells, a flat seller, owed him a commission for completing flat sales after he introduced a buyer to Wells. Wells finished developing a flat block in 2007, but seven were unsold by 2008, when Wells’ neighbour emailed Devani, the estate agent, telling him. Devani then called Wells. Devani claimed that he told Wells he was an estate agent and his commission was 2% plus VAT, but Wells argued there was never any discussion of commission. Devani contacted Newlon Housing Trust, which agreed to buy the flats for £2.1m. Once completed, Devani claimed a commission, and Wells refused.

Judge Moloney QC held there was a binding contract, but because Devani did not submit written terms it was subject to a one third reduction under the Estate Agents Act 1979 section 18. The Court of Appeal held there was no contract.

Judgment
Supreme Court held there was a binding contract, and its terms were certain, though the Estate Agents Act 1979 section 18 was not complied with. Lord Kitchin gave the first judgdment. Lord Kitchin said the following:

See also

English contract law

Notes

References

English contract case law